Irene Vernon (born Irene Vergauwen, January 16, 1922 – April 21, 1998) was an American actress.

Background
Vernon was born Irene Vergauwen in Mishawaka, Indiana, and graduated from Mishawaka High School. Following graduation, she moved to New York to become an actress. Her career began with small uncredited roles in 1940s movies. Vernon ended her movie career in 1952, but during the 1950s, she began performing television roles.

Career
Throughout the early 1950s, Vernon guest starred in shows such as Fireside Theater, The Lone Ranger, Danger, Flight, Dennis the Menace Christmas Show and The Donna Reed Show. In 1964, Vernon began portraying Louise Tate on the hit television series Bewitched. Vernon held the role until 1966.

After writer Danny Arnold left the series, the producers, actress Elizabeth Montgomery and Montgomery's husband, director William Asher, reportedly pressured Vernon to also leave the show due to her friendship with Arnold (although the official reason given was that Vernon's husband was ill). The role of Louise Tate was later taken over by Kasey Rogers.

On Broadway, Vernon performed in The Lady in Ermine (1922).

Personal life
On July 29, 1944, Vernon married U. S. Army Major Edward Duryea Dowling in Englewood, New Jersey. Before his military service, Dowling had been a director of musical shows.

Death
Irene Rosenberg (as she was known at the time of her death) died on April 21, 1998, in South Bend, Indiana, aged 76, death certificate indicates from congestive heart failure and coronary artery disease.

Filmography

References

External links
 Irene Rosenberg on FindAGrave.com
 
 

1922 births
1998 deaths
Actresses from Indiana
American film actresses
American television actresses
People from Mishawaka, Indiana
20th-century American actresses
American stage actresses